A Certain Mr. Jobim is the fourth album by Antônio Carlos Jobim. It was released in 1967 and was number 14 on the US Jazz Albums 1968 year-end chart.

Track listing

Personnel
 Antônio Carlos Jobim – piano, guitar, organ, vocals
 Claus Ogerman – arranger/conductor
 Dom Um Romão – drums
 George Lee and Ray Gilbert – producers

References

1967 albums
Antônio Carlos Jobim albums
Albums arranged by Claus Ogerman
Warner Records albums
Albums conducted by Claus Ogerman
Albums produced by Ray Gilbert